Obey the Law is a 1926 silent film adventure-drama made by the Cohn brothers, Jack and Harry Cohn, and Al Raboch. The picture stars Bert Lytell and was released through the Cohns' fledgling company Columbia Pictures. The Library of Congress holds a print of this film.

Cast
 Bert Lytell as Phil Schuyler
 Eugenia Gilbert as The Girl(billed Eugenie Gilbert)
Edna Murphy as The Daughter
Hedda Hopper as Society lady
Larry Kent as The Friend
Paul Panzer as The Crook
Sarah Padden as The Mother
William Welsh as The Father

References

External links
 Obey The Law at the Internet Movie Database
Obey The Law; allmovie.com

1926 films
American silent feature films
1926 crime drama films
Columbia Pictures films
American crime drama films
American black-and-white films
1920s American films
Silent American drama films